Jason Alexander Tack (born 5 January 1992) is an English former professional footballer.

Career statistics

Club

Notes

References

External links
 Yau Yee Football League profile
 

Living people
1992 births
English footballers
Association football defenders
Hong Kong First Division League players
Hong Kong Premier League players
Hong Kong FC players
English expatriate footballers
English expatriate sportspeople in Hong Kong
Expatriate footballers in Hong Kong